The melodious blackbird (Dives dives) is a New World tropical bird.

Description 
The adult is a medium-sized blackbird with a rounded tail. The adult plumage is entirely black with a bluish gloss, and the bill, legs and feet are also black. The iris is brown. Females are identically plumaged to the males; young birds are brownish black and lack iridescence. There are no subspecies.

Voice 
The song is a duet between pairs, with a see note, followed by a whit and a northern cardinal-like whistle. The call is a metallic .

Distribution and habitat 
D. dives is a resident breeder from coastal eastern and south-eastern Mexico to Costa Rica. Its range is expanding. El Salvador was colonized in the 1950s, and eastern Guatemala in the 1960s. Prior to 1989 there was only one Costa Rican record, but it is now easily seen at least as far south as San José, and it is expected to colonize Panama.

The melodious blackbird inhabits a wide range of habitats, but avoids dense forest and thick undergrowth. It has adapted to human habitation and can be seen in gardens and on lawns. The melodious blackbird forages mainly on the ground for insects but will also take nectar and ripening maize ears as well as other plants, such as the fruits of the gumbo-limbo (Bursera simaruba) and Trophis racemosa.

Behaviour

Breeding 
Breeding birds are highly territorial, and adults will attack predators like the brown jay, but small flocks form outside the nesting season. A breeding pair will give a display in which each bird spreads its tail, extends its wings, and ruffles its plumage.

The female lays three or four brown-blotched blue eggs, which she incubates alone, although the male helps with feeding the chicks. This species is not known to be parasitised by cowbirds, which presumably has also contributed to its success.

Status 
This species has benefited from deforestation, which has allowed its rapid range expansion through the creation of suitable habitat.

References

Further reading

 Jaramillo, Alvaro & Burke, Peter (1999): New World Blackbirds. Christopher Helm, London. 
 Stiles, F. Gary & Skutch, Alexander Frank (1989): A guide to the birds of Costa Rica. Comistock, Ithaca.

External links

 
 
Photo and article at birdguatemala.org
 

melodious blackbird
Birds of Central America
Birds of Mexico
Birds of the Yucatán Peninsula
Birds of Belize
Birds of Guatemala
Birds of Honduras
Birds of El Salvador
Birds of Nicaragua
Birds of Costa Rica
melodious blackbird
melodious blackbird